Herbert Howson (11 August 1872 – 8 May 1948) was an Australian rules footballer who played with South Melbourne in the Victorian Football League (VFL).

Football
A wingman, Howson played with South Melbourne for four seasons in the Victorian Football Association (VFA) before he joined their inaugural VFL side in 1897. He participated in their losing 1896 VFA premiership play-off and 1899 Grand Final teams.

At the end of the 1899 season, in the process of naming his own "champion player", the football correspondent for The Argus ("Old Boy"), selected a team of the best players of the 1899 VFL competition:Backs: Maurie Collins (Essendon), Bill Proudfoot (Collingwood), Peter Burns (Geelong); Halfbacks: Pat Hickey (Fitzroy), George Davidson (South Melbourne), Alf Wood (Melbourne); Centres: Fred Leach (Collingwood), Firth McCallum (Geelong), Harry Wright (Essendon); Wings: Charlie Pannam (Collingwood), Eddie Drohan (Fitzroy), Herb Howson (South Melbourne); Forwards: Bill Jackson (Essendon), Eddy James (Geelong), Charlie Colgan (South Melbourne); Ruck: Mick Pleass (South Melbourne), Frank Hailwood (Collingwood), Joe McShane (Geelong); Rovers: Dick Condon (Collingwood), Bill McSpeerin (Fitzroy), Teddy Rankin (Geelong).From those he considered to be the three best players — that is, Condon, Hickey, and Pleass — he selected Pat Hickey as his "champion player" of the season. ('Old Boy', "Football: A Review of the Season", (Monday, 18 September 1899), p.6).

Cricket
In 1903 he appeared in a first-class cricket match for Victoria, against Tasmania. He scored 40 in his first innings and took a couple of wickets.

Coaching
Howson was appointed coach of South Melbourne, in a non-playing capacity, in 1918 and led them to the premiership with the help of Henry Elms, who shared the coaching duties with him. That season the club were premiers and the following season finished third.

See also
 List of Victoria first-class cricketers
 The Footballers' Alphabet

Notes

References
 'Follower', "The Footballers' Alphabet", The Leader, (Saturday, 23 July 1898), p. 17.
 South Melbourne Team, Melbourne Punch, (Thursday, 4 June 1903), p. 16.

External links 
 
 
 Cricinfo profile

1872 births
1948 deaths
Sydney Swans coaches
Sydney Swans Premiership coaches
Sydney Swans players
Australian cricketers
Victoria cricketers
Cricketers from Victoria (Australia)
Australian rules footballers from Victoria (Australia)
One-time VFL/AFL Premiership coaches